The Temple of Original Ancestor was built either in 1804 or during the third year of Gia Long's rule to commemorate the duke Nguyễn Kim who was the ancestor of Nguyễn dynasty.


History
Temple of Original Ancestor is located to the north of the Ancestral Temple. Its design was inspired by Ming's architecture, most notably with a rectangular perimeter that represents the script king (王), three main doors facing southward. The interior of the temple consists of an altar, on which two plaques of the Original Ancestor and his lady are placed.

A poem can be found inscribed on the ceiling, with its content presumably praising the following merit of the Original Ancestor, that :
開國承家，Khai quốc thừa gia,
守成繼體。Thủ thành kế thể.
報本崇原，Báo bản sùng nguyên,
洽斯百禮。Hiệp tư bách lễ.
The temple was badly damaged during the 1968 Tet Offensive.

However, this "newly restored" temple was panned by the press for being too flashy and unaesthetic, given the original intent of how Huế's art works should look during the Golden Age. The mosaics on the roof are rendered rough and do not seem to describe a classical legend of Confucius.

References

External links
 Phục chế các án thờ hoàng gia ở Triệu Tổ miếu
 Trùng tu xong Triệu Tổ miếu với kinh phí 35,1 tỉ đồng
 Đại sứ Hoa Kỳ dự khánh thành dự án tu bổ Triệu Tổ miếu

Buildings and structures in Huế